The Punjab Tianjin University of Technology (PTUT) is a public university located in Lahore, Punjab, Pakistan.

References

External links
 PTUT official website

2018 establishments in Pakistan
Public universities and colleges in Punjab, Pakistan
Vocational education in Pakistan
Universities and colleges in Lahore